Marulanda is a Spanish and Basque surname, it is mostly used in Spain and Colombia.  It may refer to:

Surname

Manuel Marulanda Velez, FARC Commander
 Ivan Marulanda Gomez,  Colombian politician
María Isabel Mejía Marulanda, Colombian politician
Victoriana Mejía Marulanda, Colombian diplomat
Carlos Arturo Marulanda, Colombian politician
Lina Marulanda, Colombian television personality, model
Albalucía Ángel Marulanda, Colombian writer, novelist 
Gustavo Giron Marulanda, Australian-Colombian footballer
Víctor Hugo Marulanda, Colombian footballer

Places
Marulanda, Gipuzkoa,  Pais Vasco, a town in Spain
Marulanda, Caldas, a town and municipality in Colombia